Hope Against Hope may refer to:

an autobiographical work by Nadezhda Mandelshtam covering the period of Stalinism
Hope Against Hope (album), a noise rock album released in 1988.